Salehabad-e Seyyedabad (also Romanized as Sāleḥābād-e Seyyedābād) is a village in Aftab Rural District, Aftab District, Tehran County, Tehran Province, Iran. At the 2006 census, its population was 2,420, in 564 families.

References 

Populated places in Tehran County